Williamnagar is one of the 60 assembly constituencies of Meghalaya, a north east state of India. This constituency falls under Tura Lok Sabha constituency. It is part of the East Garo Hills district and is reserved for candidates belonging to the Scheduled Tribes. The current MLA from this constituency is Marcuise Marak of National People's Party.

Members of Legislative Assembly

Election results

2018

See also
 List of constituencies of the Meghalaya Legislative Assembly
 Williamnagar
 East Garo Hills district

References

Assembly constituencies of Meghalaya
East Garo Hills district